The women's javelin throw at the 2019 World Athletics Championships was held at the Khalifa International Stadium in Doha, Qatar, on 30 September and 1 October 2019.

Summary
On the second throw of the competition, returning bronze medalist Lü Huihui took the lead with a 64.93m. Three throwers later, her Chinese teammate Liu Shiying almost matched that with a 64.81m effort. Defending champion Barbora Špotáková fouled. The third-place thrower was Kelsey-Lee Barber, almost two metres behind. In the second round, Lü improved to 65.06m and Christin Hussong landed one only a centimetre behind, while Špotáková only managed a 59.52m. By the time of Špotáková's third attempt, she already knew Tatsiana Khaladovich held the #8 spot with 60.84m. She at least needed to beat that to continue in the competition, but her throw was almost a metre short. With a new champion destined, nobody improved through the fourth round. In the fifth, Liu threw a 65.88m to take the lead. Lü responded with a 65.49m but still not enough.

Records
Before the competition records were as follows:

Schedule
The event schedule, in local time (UTC+3), was as follows:

Qualification
Qualification: Qualifying distance 63.50 (Q) or the 12 best athletes including ties  (q) advanced to the final.

Final
The final was started on 1 October at 21:22.

References

Women's javelin throw
Javelin throw at the World Athletics Championships